Otto Leonard Colee (December 4, 1895 – August 10, 1969) was a college football player and dental surgeon. A star guard and fullback for the Tulane Green Wave, he was All-Southern in 1917, captain in 1918.

References

Tulane Green Wave football players
All-Southern college football players
American football fullbacks
1895 births
1969 deaths